Harold Hansen (born May 24, 1946) is a Canadian former professional soccer player who earned two caps for the national team in 1967 (U23) and 1968 (Senior). He also represented Canada at the 1967 Pan American Games.

In 1968, he spent the season with the Washington Darts of the American Soccer League and the Atlanta Chiefs of the North American Soccer League. In 1969, he was part of the British Columbia U-23 team which won the Canadian Soccer Association Challenge Cup.  During the 1969-1970 PCSL season, he played for Croatia SC.

References

External links

NASL career stats

1946 births
Living people
Soccer players from Vancouver
Association football forwards
Washington Darts players
Atlanta Chiefs players
Canadian expatriate sportspeople in the United States
Canadian expatriate soccer players
Canada men's under-23 international soccer players
Canada men's international soccer players
Canadian soccer players
Pan American Games competitors for Canada
Footballers at the 1967 Pan American Games
Expatriate soccer players in the United States
American Soccer League (1933–1983) players
North American Soccer League (1968–1984) players